Mac Craith (Meic Craith, plural form) is an Irish surname, one branch of which is rendered McGrath.

Alternate forms
Among many alternate forms are McCragh, Crah, Crow and Crowe. Some of the forms may link the Mac Craith name to the ancestral name MacConcrada.

Historical mentions
At least two distinct families named Mac Craith lived in medieval Ireland.

The Meic Craith of Thomond were a learned family with close ties to Clare Abbey, an Augustinian foundation. They were historians and poets of the Uí Bhriain kings and earls of Thomond.

Another family of the name, not known to be related, were natives of Termon McGrath, Lough Erne.

Notables
Members of the Thomond family recorded in the Irish annals included:

 Mac Raith, son of Cú Dub, eminent chief of Clann Scandláin of Dál Cais, the best "ex-layman" since Nár, son of Guaire, for piety and bestowing of food to poor people, rested in Christ in Mungarit in 1067.
 The son of Mac Raith, the poet, rested in Christ in 1097
 Eoghan mac Donagh Mhaoil Mac Craith, died 1240
 MacCraith a Tarthoir (the Protector), died 1395
 Aedh Mac Craith, Junior, whose lands were despoiled by Lord Furnival in 1415
 Owen MacCraith, died 1450
 Sean mac Ruaidhri MacCraith, died 1580

Other notable members of the family include:

 Seán mac Ruaidhrí Mac Craith (fl. 14th-century), author of Caithréim Thoirdhealbhaigh
 Mathghamhain Mág Raith, Bishop of Killaloe, Bishop of Killaloe, 1389–1400
 Donatus Mág Raith, O.S.A., Bishop of Killaloe, 1400–1421
 Thaddaeus Mág Raith I, Bishop of Killaloe, 1423–1433
 Thaddaeus Mág Raith II, Bishop of Killaloe, 1460–1463
 Miler Magrath (1523? – 1622), Archbishop of Cashel
 Aindreas MacCraith (1723–1790) known as An Mangaire Sugach (The Jolly Merchant), buried in Kilmallock
 John Magrath, soldier in the Irish Rebellion of 1798
 Andrew Gordon Magrath (1813–1893), Governor of Carolina, his son

See also
 Clan McGrath

References

External links
 http://www.clarelibrary.ie/eolas/coclare/genealogy/mcgrath_family.htm
 http://www.irishtimes.com/ancestor/surname/index.cfm?fuseaction=History&Surname=mcgrath&UserID=

Surnames
Irish families
Surnames of Irish origin
Irish Brehon families
Anglicised Irish-language surnames
Roman Catholic families
Septs of the Dál gCais